Giovanni Bonaventura Genelli (28 September 179813 November 1868) was a German painter.

Biography
Genelli was born in Berlin in 1798. He was the son of Janus Genelli, a painter whose landscapes are still preserved in the Schloss at Berlin; and grandson of Joseph Genelli, a Roman embroiderer employed to found a school of tapestries by Frederick the Great. Genelli's three uncles included an architect, painter, printmaker and porcelain designer between them, and Genelli's son Camillo (1840–1867) was a painter.  Bonaventura is mainly remembered for his Neoclassical drawings and prints in an outline style reminiscent of John Flaxman.

Bonaventura Genelli first took lessons from his father, then became a student of the Prussian Academy of the Arts.  After serving his time in the guards he went on a stipend to Rome, where he lived ten years. Genelli was a friend and an assistant to landscape painter Joseph Anton Koch, and a colleague of the sculptor Ernst Hähnel (1811–1891) and painters Johann Christian Reinhart, Johann Friedrich Overbeck and Joseph von Führich.

In 1830 Genelli was commissioned by Dr. Härtel to adorn a villa at Leipzig with frescoes, but after quarrelling with this patron he withdrew to Munich, where he earned a scanty livelihood at first, though he succeeded at last in acquiring repute as an illustrative and figure draughtsman. In 1859 he was appointed a professor at Weimar, where he died in 1868.

Genelli painted few pictures, and it is very rare to find his canvases in public galleries, but in 1911 there were six of his compositions in oil in the Schack collection at Munich. These canvases, numerous watercolors, as well as designs for engravings and lithographs reveal Genelli's interest in the antique and a fascination with the works of Michelangelo. Though a German by birth, his spirit was unlike that of Overbeck or Führich, whose art was reminiscent of the old masters of their own country. Genelli seemed to hark back to the land of his fathers and endeavor to revive the traditions of the Italian Renaissance. Subtle in thought and powerfully conceived, his compositions are usually mythological, but full of matter, energetic and fiery in execution, and marked almost invariably by daring effects of foreshortening. Impeded by straitened means, the artist seems frequently to have drawn from imagination rather than from life, and much of his anatomy of muscle is in consequence conventional and false. Nonetheless Genelli merits his reputation as a bold and imaginative artist, and his name deserves to be remembered beyond the narrow limits of the early schools of Munich and Weimar.

His drawing Male Nude was found as part of the Munich Art Hoard.

See also
 List of German painters

Notes

References

External links

1798 births
1868 deaths
19th-century German painters
German male painters
German people of Italian descent
German people of Danish descent
Artists from Berlin
19th-century German male artists